Buffalo Public School No. 57, also known as Broadway Village Elementary Community School, is a historic school building located in the Broadway-Fillmore neighborhood of Buffalo, Erie County, New York. It was built in 1914, and is a three-story, red brick building over a full basement with Classical Revival detailing. It is connected to a one-story auditorium building by a one-story hyphen.  The building was originally constructed as an addition to the original 1897 Public School No. 57, which was demolished in 1960. The school has been redeveloped as a multi-use facility including apartments, offices, and a community center.

It was listed on the National Register of Historic Places in 2018.

References

External links
Buffalo Rising: Hope House Project Moving Forward

School buildings on the National Register of Historic Places in New York (state)
Neoclassical architecture in New York (state)
School buildings completed in 1914
Buildings and structures in Buffalo, New York
National Register of Historic Places in Buffalo, New York
1914 establishments in New York (state)